This was the third season of Barnes Football Club.  Significant developments included the club's first known "athletic sports" event, a day on which club members and members of the public were invited to take part in athletic competitions.

Athletic Sports
 Date: 25 March 1865
 Venue: The Limes, Mortlake. (Field lent by Marsh Nelson adjacent to the White Hart public house)
 Stewards: Ebenezer Morley, M. Dewsnap, Robert Graham, C. H. Tubbs
 Secretary: Robert Willis
 Events: 100 yards race, half mile race, one mile race, 150 yard hurdle race, long jump, high jump, putting the shell, kicking the football.

Notes

Barnes F.C. seasons
Barnes